Forder is a village near Saltash in Cornwall, England.

It was demolished after the line was diverted to a more inland alignment on 19 May 1908.

References

Villages in Cornwall